Arkansas Highway 363 is the name of two state highways in Pope County.

Section 1
Arkansas Highway 363 is a  state highway in Pope County near Pottsville. The route runs north from U.S. Route 64 (US 64) and AR 247 across Interstate 40 (I-40) to terminate at Phillips Road.

Section 2

Arkansas Highway 363 is a brief  state highway in Pope County. It runs east into Atkins to terminate at AR 105 at the interchange with I-40 (exit 94).

References

External links

363
Transportation in Pope County, Arkansas